"Moments Like This" is a popular song with music by Burton Lane and lyrics by Frank Loesser, published in 1938. It was written for the 1938 film College Swing when it was performed by Florence George.

Notable recordings 
 1938 Maxine Sullivan - recorded on March 1, 1938 for Victor (catalog No. 25802).
 1953 Dean Martin - sung in the film Money from Home.
 1956 Julie London - in the album Lonely Girl.
 1958 Dinah Shore - Moments Like These.
 1960 Peggy Lee - Pretty Eyes
 1962 Johnny Mathis - included in the album Rapture.
 1990 Michael Feinstein - for his album Michael Feinstein Sings the Burton Lane Songbook, Vol. 1.

References

Songs with music by Burton Lane
1938 songs
Songs written by Frank Loesser